Chris Sullo is a security expert known as the author of Nikto Web Scanner. He is specialized in web-security and pen-testing. He was the co-founder, CFO and Treasurer of Open Security Foundation, and creator of the RVAsec security conference. He currently works as a penetration testing specialist for the IT risk firm Focal Point Data Risk.

OSVDB 
Sullo was acting as a Moderator and Vulnerability Manager of OSVDB. He has been a mentor of Google Summer Code since OSVDB was accepted as a mentor organization for Google's Summer of Code 2006 and 2007. He handled and approved all new vulnerabilities that are added to the database as well as manages the web checks. In addition, Chris is co-founder and Treasurer of the Open Security Foundation.

Nikto 
Sullo is the author of Nikto, the leading open source web security assessment tool. It is an open source web server scanner. Nikto is known to perform comprehensive tests against web servers for multiple items, including over thousands of potentially dangerous files or CGI scripts, etc. Nikto was voted the #16 top security tool in 2003, and #12 in 2006 in Fyodor's Top Security Tools Survey.

RVAsec
He is co-founder of the RVAsec security conference held in Richmond, Virginia, USA.

Security advisories 
Sullo has long been involved with the world of electronic crime and security. He has also published a few security advisories. One of his noteworthy advisories was an advisory on Verity Ultraseek, a search engine used by dozens of government agencies and universities.

References

External links
Interview with Chris Sullo By CGISecurity.com

Year of birth missing (living people)
Living people